Patrick Molloy may refer to:

 Patrick Molloy, one of the Bridgewater Four
 Patrick J. Molloy (born 1961), Garda Síochána officer
 Patrick Molloy (surgeon) (1928–2020), pioneering New Zealand cardiothoracic surgeon at the Otago Medical School